The Macau Tower Convention and Entertainment Center, also known as Macau Tower , is a tower located in Sé, Macau. The tower measures 338 m (1,109 ft) in height from ground level to the highest point. Its observation deck features views, restaurants, theaters, shopping malls and the Skywalk X, a walking tour around the outer rim. It offers the best view of Macau and in recent years has been used for a variety of adventurous activities.

The tower was created by Moller Architects and is one of the members of the World Federation of Great Towers. In addition to observation and entertainment, the tower is also used for telecommunications and broadcasting.  It and the Grand Lisboa hotel are the most recognizable landmarks of the Macau skyline.

History

On a visit to Auckland, New Zealand, Macau casino billionaire Stanley Ho Hung-Sun was so impressed by the Sky Tower in Auckland that he commissioned a similar one to be built in Macau. The tower was designed by New Zealand engineering firm Beca Group and Gordon Moller of Moller Architects for Sociedade de Turismo e Diversões de Macau. Construction work of the tower started in 1998, and the tower was officially opened on December 19, 2001. The architect for the tower was Les Dykstra.

Bungee jumping
The tower has routinely been used as a site for staged bungee jumping events, by professional jumpers or as part of entertainment shows. 

On December 17, 2006, the father of contemporary bungee jumping, A J Hackett, and popular artist Edison Chen broke two Guinness World Records at the Macau Tower.  A J Hackett, broke his own Guinness World Record of "The Highest Bungee Jump from a Building" achieved in 1987 from the Eiffel Tower.  Edison Chen represented Macau Tower in the inaugural jump to bid for "The World's Highest Bungee Jump Facility". 

Jack Osbourne bungee-jumped off the tower as part of the third series of Jack Osbourne: Adrenaline Junkie. Anthony Bourdain bungee-jumped from the top floor of the building in an episode of Anthony Bourdain: No Reservations. It was also used on the Chinese variety show  for episode 1. The two team captains, Wang Han and Yuan Hong, with their members, were given a mission - sky relay - to be completed on the tower as short a time as possible. Yuan Hong's team won the game, and Wang Han's team was given the punishment of bungee-jumping from the Tower. The jump was carried out by team members Xie Na and Joe Chen.

In popular culture
The tower served as the venue of photoshoot of Episode 10, America's Next Top Model Cycle 18: British Invasion. She also revealed that the weather was so bad, that the tower was closed “to the public due to the treacherous weather”.

It was also featured in the third episode of An Idiot Abroad 3, with Karl Pilkington and Warwick Davis walking around the perimeter of one of the highest floors and Davis undertaking a controlled descent to the ground.

It was used on the South Korean variety show Running Man for episode 133. The cast (not including Kim Jongkook) and their guests, Lee Dong-wook and Han Hye-jin, were given three missions - sky jump, mast climb, and sky walk - to be completed on the tower to acquire the three characters they needed to continue onto the next mission.

The tower was the site of a "Roadblock" task in an episode of American version of The Amazing Race: All-Stars that originally aired on April 22, 2007, on CBS as well as a Roadblock on The Amazing Race Canada 2 in 2014. The tower also appeared in one Roadblock each on two episodes of The Amazing Race Asia 3.

See also
 List of towers
 List of tallest freestanding structures in the world
 Sky Tower (Auckland)

References

External links

 
 

Towers completed in 2001
Skyscrapers in Macau
Tourist attractions in Macau
Observation towers in China
Sé, Macau
Landmarks in Macau
Towers with revolving restaurants
2001 establishments in Macau
Bungee jumping sites